The 2021 Alabama Crimson Tide football team (variously "Alabama", "Bama", or "The Tide") represented the University of Alabama in the 2021 NCAA Division I FBS football season. This season marked the Crimson Tide's 127th overall season, 88th as a member of the Southeastern Conference (SEC), and 30th within the SEC Western Division. They played their home games at Bryant–Denny Stadium in Tuscaloosa, Alabama, and were led by 15th-year head coach Nick Saban.

Alabama entered the 2021 season as the defending consensus national champions and SEC champions and appeared in the 2022 College Football National Championship to defend their title against Georgia in a rematch from 2021 SEC Championship Game and 2018 College Football Playoff National Championship, after beating an undefeated Cincinnati in the College Football Playoff Semifinal. Alabama was defeated by Georgia in the National Championship game 33–18.

Previous season
They finished the season undefeated with a record of 13–0 (10–0 in the SEC) and as national champions. Looking to build on the successes of the 2019 campaign, Alabama entered the 2020 season as the favorite to win the Western Division and meet the Florida Gators in the 2020 SEC Championship Game. Alabama closed the regular season with a 11–0 record including five wins against Top 25-ranked teams—and met the Gators for the SEC Championship in a rematch of the 2016 contest. Alabama was victorious by a final score of 52–46 to captured their 9th SEC championship title. The following day, final College Football Playoff(CFP) standings were unveiled. No. 1 ranked Alabama would meet No. 4 ranked Notre Dame for the Rose Bowl game in a rematch of the 2013 contest, defeated the Fighting Irish 31–14 to meet No. 3 ranked Ohio State Buckeyes for the College Football Playoff National Championship Game in a rematch of their 2015 contest. In the College Football Playoff National Championship, the Crimson Tide defeated the Buckeyes, 52–24, to capture their third CFP National Championship title in seven years. The victory over Ohio State gave Alabama their 18th national championship in football (their thirteenth wire service title since the AP Poll began in 1936) and their tenth perfect season since 1925.

The season marked the first time a wide receiver at Alabama won the Heisman Trophy, as DeVonta Smith won the award over several finalists including Clemson Tigers quarterback Trevor Lawrence. Other award winners included quarterback Mac Jones, who won the Davey O’Brien Award and Johnny Unitas Golden Arm Award, running back Najee Harris who won the Doak Walker Award and offensive coordinator Steve Sarkisian, who won the Broyles Award as the nation's top assistant coach. Also, six players were named to various All-America Teams with Patrick Surtain II, DeVonta Smith, and Mac Jones being consensus selections and Smith and Surtain each being unanimous selections.

The team finished the 2020 season with a final ranking of No. 1 in both the AP and Coaches' Polls.

Offseason

NFL draft
 
 
The following Crimson Tide players were selected in the 2021 NFL Draft. Alabama had six players drafted in the first round, tying Miami (FL) in 2004 for most all time.

Position key

Coaching changes
Steve Sarkisian, former offensive coordinator of the Crimson Tide, accepted a position as head football coach of Texas. He was replaced by Bill O'Brien. Charles Huff, former Associate Head Coach/Running backs coach accepted the head coaching position at Marshall and was replaced by Todd Watson as Associate Head Coach and Robert Gillespie as Running backs coach. Former Special teams coordinator/Tight end coach Jeff Banks left to accept a position as the Assistant Coach/Special teams coordinator/Tight end coach for Texas and was replaced by Jay Graham. Former Cornerbacks coach Karl Scott left and went to fill a position as a Defensive backs coach for the Minnesota Vikings and has been replaced by Jay Valai. Former Offensive line coach Kyle Flood left to be the Offensive Coordinator/Offensive line coach for Texas and was replaced by Doug Marrone. On March 24, 2021, Jay Graham left the program after only two months of being with the Tide and was replaced by Drew Svoboda.

Players

Transfers

Outgoing

The Crimson Tide lost ten players via transfer from the 2020 season.

Incoming

Recruiting class

The Crimson Tide signed a total of 26 scholarship recruits and 1 walk-ons during national signing period.

Overall class rankings

Recruits

Returning starters

Offense

Defense

Special teams

Preseason

Award watch lists
Listed in the order that they were released

SEC media days
The 2021 SEC Media days will be held in July 19–22, 2021 at the Hyatt Regency Birmingham – The Wynfrey Hotel in Hoover, Alabama. The Preseason Polls will be released on July 23, 2021. Each team had their head coach available to talk to the media at the event. Coverage of the event was televised on SEC Network and ESPN.

Preseason All-SEC teams (media)
The Crimson Tide placed 16 representatives on the Preseason All-SEC Team, including eight on the first team - six on defense.

Offense

1st team

John Metchie III – WR

Evan Neal – OL

2nd team

Jahleel Billingsley - TE

Emil Ekiyor Jr. - OL

3rd team

Brian Robinson Jr. - RB

Defense

1st team

Phidarian Mathis - DL

Henry To'oTo'o – LB

Christian Harris - LB

Josh Jobe - DB

Malachi Moore - DB

2nd team

LaBryan Ray - DL

Jordan Battle - DB

3rd team

DJ Dale - DL

Christopher Allen - LB

Specialists

2nd team

Will Reichard – K

References:

Preseason AP All-Americans

Offense

1st team

Evan Neal – OL

2nd team

John Metchie III – WR

Emil Ekiyor Jr. - OL

Defense

1st team

Will Anderson Jr. – LB

2nd team

Christian Harris - LB

References:

Preseason All-SEC teams (coaches)
The Crimson Tide placed 15 representatives on the Preseason All-SEC Team, including eight on the first team - six on defense.

Offense

1st team

John Metchie III – WR

Evan Neal – OL

2nd team

Jahleel Billingsley - TE

Emil Ekiyor Jr. - OL

3rd team

Brian Robinson Jr. - RB

Defense

1st team

Phidarian Mathis - DL

Will Anderson Jr. – LB

Christian Harris - LB

Josh Jobe - DB

Malachi Moore - DB

2nd team

Henry To'oTo'o - LB

Jordan Battle - DB

3rd team

LaBryan Ray - DL

Christopher Allen - LB

Specialists

3rd team

Will Reichard – K

References:

Personnel

Coaching staff

Graduate assistants
Max Bullough
 Montana Murphy
 Jamey Mosley
 Manrey Saint-Amour
Analysts
 Dean Altobelli 
 George Banko
 Bert Biffani 
 Johnathan Galante 
 Jake Long
Alex Mortensen 
Will Lawing
Ron Cooper
 Mark Oprhey
Dave Huxtable
 Nick Cochran

Roster

Depth chart

True Freshman
Double Position : *

Spring game
The Crimson Tide held spring practices in March and April with the Alabama football spring game, "A-Day", held on April 17. Due to COVID-19 and limited capacity at the stadium, tickets were sold, a change from previous years when fans could attend without paying admission. The announced attendance at the game was 47,218.

Regular season

Schedule
The 2021 Crimson Tide' schedule consisted of 7 home games, 4 away games, and 1 neutral site game for the regular season. Alabama hosted four SEC conference opponents Arkansas, Ole Miss (rivalry), Tennessee (Third Saturday in October) and rival LSU (rivalry) to close out the SEC regular season at home and travelled to four SEC opponents Florida  (rivalry), Mississippi State (rivalry), Texas A&M, and arch-rival Auburn for the 86th Iron Bowl to close out the SEC regular season on the road. Alabama was not scheduled to play SEC East opponents Georgia (rivalry), Kentucky, Missouri, South Carolina, and Vanderbilt in the 2021 regular season. The Crimson Tide's bye week was during week 9 (on October 30, 2021).

Alabama's out-of-conference opponents represented the ACC, C-USA, Independents, and Southern. The Crimson Tide hosted four non–conference games which were against New Mexico State from the FBS independents, Southern Miss from the Conference USA and Mercer from the SoCon to close out the regular season and hosted Miami (FL) (ACC) in Atlanta, GA in the Chick-fil-A Kickoff Game.

Schedule Source:

Game summaries

vs. No. 14 Miami

The Crimson Tide opened the 2021 season at Mercedes-Benz Stadium in Atlanta, Georgia against the No. 14-ranked Miami Hurricanes. It was the programs' first meeting since the Crimson Tide's win over the Hurricanes in the 1993 Sugar Bowl. Alabama entered the contest as a 19.5-point favorite. The Tide's opening drive of 7 plays and 75 yards culminated in a 37-yard touchdown pass from Bryce Young to John Metchie III, giving Alabama a 7–0 lead. Following a punt by Miami, Alabama drove 60 yards in 11 plays for a 38-yard field goal by junior Will Reichard, putting the Tide ahead 10–0. Miami then went three-and-out. At the end of the first quarter, the Tide led 10–0. To begin the second quarter, the Tide offense continued its prowess with a 10-play, 80-yard touchdown drive capped by a Bryce Young pass to Cameron Latu. The Tide led 17–0. Reichard added a 51-yard field goal following a D'Eriq King fumble that was recovered by Phidarian Mathis, making the count 20–0. After a Hurricanes three-and-out, Bryce Young drove the Tide 74 yards, finished off by another touchdown reception by Latu. The score was now 27–0. After trading punts, the 'Canes drove 60 yards in 12 plays for a 37-yard Andres Borregales field goal to cut the deficit to 27–3. The Tide closed the first half with a 27–3 lead.

To open the second half, King led the Canes 74 yards in 14 plays; however, the drive ended in a turnover on downs after King's 4th-and-1 rush was stopped by Henry To'oTo'o and Will Anderson Jr. Shortly thereafter, Bryce Young connected with junior wide receiver Jameson Williams for a 94-yard touchdown, putting Alabama ahead 34–3. On the Canes' next drive, D'Eriq King was intercepted by Malachi Moore. The Tide offense found paydirt following the turnover by means of a 20-yard touchdown run by Trey Sanders. 'Bama now led 41–3. Miami would respond with its first touchdown drive of the game - 75 yards in 7 plays concluding with a 29-yard reception by Xavier Restrepo. The count was now 41–10. The Tide committed its first turnover of the season when Chantz Williams sacked Bryce Young, leading Jordan Miller to recover at the Alabama 25. Miller's recovery would lead to a 28-yard field goal by Borregales to put the 'Canes behind 41–13. The Tide took a 41–13 lead into the fourth quarter, where the only scoring came from a 40-yard Reichard field goal en route to a 44-13 Crimson Tide victory. In his first collegiate start, Young completed 27 of 38 passes for 344 yard and 4 touchdowns. The Crimson Tide earned 510 total yards of offense, including 354 through the air.

Mercer

Sources:

Alabama returned to Bryant-Denny Stadium for its first home contest of the season against the Mercer Bears of the Southern Conference of FCS. The Tide had won the most recent meeting 56–0 in 2017. In the early part of the first quarter, the teams traded punts until Chris Braswell blocked a punt by Mercer's Trey Turk. Jase McClellan returned the loose football 33 yards for a touchdown to put the Tide ahead 7–0. On the Bears' next series, Carter Peevy's pass was intercepted by Ga'Quincy McKinstry at the Alabama 46. The Tide then drove 54 yards, capped by a 4-yard touchdown run by Brian Robinson Jr., to go ahead 14–0. At the end of the first quarter the Tide led 14–0. On the first play of the second quarter, Bryce Young found Slade Bolden for an 18-yard touchdown to make the lead 21–0. Later in the quarter, the Tide took advantage of a short field and drove 29 yards ending in another touchdown by McClellan to make the score 28–0. On Alabama's next drive, Will Reichard converted on a 30-yard field goal, which allowed the Tide to take a 31–0 lead into halftime.

After a Mercer three-and-out, the Tide completed a 5-play, 81-yard drive after Young found Jameson Williams for an 8-yard touchdown. The Tide led 38–0. The Bears responded with a 5-play, 85-yard drive capped by a 60-yard pass from Fred Payton to Devron Harper to cut the deficit to 38–7. Jase McClellan would then account for his third score of the day off a 21-yard touchdown reception from Young, giving the Tide a 45–7 lead. After cornerback Marcus Banks intercepted Fred Payton at the Mercer 47, Paul Tyson took the offense 31 yards in 5 plays. However, Reichard missed on a 34-yard field goal attempt. Going into the fourth quarter the Tide led 45–7. Mercer reached the end zone a second time with 12:30 left after Payton found Ty James for a 22 yards to put the Bears behind 45–14. Quarterback Jalen Milroe the drove the Tide 38 yards in 11 plays for a 40-yard Reichard field goal to make the count 48–14, which was the final score. Bryce Young went 19 for 27 for 227 yards and three touchdowns. The Tide earned 424 total yards of offense, including 266 through the air.

at No. 11 Florida

In a rematch of the 2020 SEC Championship Game, the Crimson Tide traveled to Ben Hill Griffin Stadium for its first SEC matchup of the season. After receiving the opening kickoff, the Tide drove 75 yards in 8 plays after a 7-yard touchdown from Bryce Young to Jase McClellan to go up 7–0. The Gators then drove 75 yards in 11 plays but were forced to settle for a 25-yard field goal by former walk-on kicker Chris Howard, making the count 7–3. The Tide then marched 75 yards in 7 plays, with Young finding tight end Jahleel Billingsley for a 26-yard touchdown. The lead was now 14–3. On the Gators' ensuing drive, Emory Jones was intercepted by Tide cornerback Jalyn Armour-Davis at the Florida 42. The Tide offense utilized the short field as Young connected with Brian Robinson Jr. for a 7-yard touchdown, going up 21–3. The Crimson Tide took a 21–3 lead into the second quarter. Following the Robinson touchdown, the offenses traded punts until Mailk Davis found paydirt on a 26-yard run with 6:34 left in the half. Notably, Chris Howard's extra point was no good, making the score 21–9. The Tide took led 21–9 at the end of the first half.

To begin the second half, Jones led the Gators 75 yards in 10 plays, culminated by a 3-yard touchdown by running back Dameon Pierce, cutting the deficit to 21–16. Young and the Tide offense answered with a 13-play, 74-yard drive cemented by a 3-yard touchdown rush by Robinson to go up 28–16. Helped out by a 30-yard run by Nay'Quan Wright, Emory Jones culminated an 11-play, 99-yard drive with a 5-yard scramble for a touchdown to make the count 28–23. At the end of the third quarter, Alabama led 28–23. Following Jones' rushing touchdown, Young led the Tide to the Florida 1. However, due to a false start penalty by Chris Owens, Alabama was forced to settle for a 23-yard field goal by Will Reichard to make the Tide lead 31–23. Thus, with 9:25 remaining in the game, the Gators still trailed by only one score. Emory Jones and the Gators' offense responded with a 12-play, 75-yard drive that was capped by a 17-yard touchdown run by Dameon Pierce. However, on the ensuing two-point conversion attempt, Malik Davis was tackled short of the goal line, leaving the Gators trailing 31–29. The Tide offense attempted to run out the clock by means of Brian Robinson Jr. and Jase McClellan. Nevertheless, on 4th-and-2 from the Alabama 43, James Burnip punted the ball back to Jones and the Gators. Punt returner Xzavier Henderson fair caught the punt at the Florida 23 with 4 seconds remaining. After dropping back to pass on 1st-and-10, Emory Jones was tackled at the line of scrimmage, allowing the Tide to hang on for a narrow 31–29 win. Bryce Young had yet another impressive performance, completing 22 of 35 passes for 233 yards, 3 touchdowns, and no interceptions. The Tide had 327 total yards of offense.

Southern Miss

Sources:

Following a narrow win in Gainesville, the Tide returned to Bryant-Denny Stadium to face the Southern Miss Golden Eagles out of Conference USA. At the start of the first half, Jameson Williams returned Briggs Bourgeois's kickoff 100 yards for a Crimson Tide touchdown and a 7–0 lead. On the Tide's first offensive series, Bryce Young found Jahleel Billingsley for a 16-yard touchdown to go up 14–0. After the Golden Eagles had driven to the Alabama 30, Ty Keyes was intercepted by DeMarcco Hellams. The Tide would proceed to drive 77 yards, culminated in a pass from Bryce Young to Jameson Williams, a fumble by the latter, and a recovery in the end zone by Cameron Latu for a touchdown, giving the Tide a 21–0 lead at the end of the first quarter. Following a 55-yard run by Roydell Williams to the Southern Miss 1, the sophomore running back converted with a 1-yard touchdown to put the Tide up 28–0. On the Tide's next offensive series, Bryce Young found Jameson Williams for an 81-yard touchdown to grab a 35–0 lead. With 5:26 remaining in the first half, Ty Keyes found Chandler Pittman for a 14-yard touchdown, cutting the margin to 35–7. The Tide would wrap up the first half with a 10-play, 97-yard drive capped by a 9-yard touchdown from Young to Jase McClellan. The Tide led 42–7 at the end of the first half.

After an opening three-and-out by the Golden Eagles, Bryce Young found Latu once again, this time from 11 yards out. The Tide led 49–7. On the next offensive series, Young drove the Tide to the Southern Miss 29 before being intercepted by Malik Shorts, his first of the season. Following the series, Bryce Young was finished for the day. The Tide led 49–7 at the end of the third quarter. Coming off Shorts' interception, the Golden Eagles drove 84 yards in 12 plays, capped by a 12-yard touchdown reception by Demarcus Jones. The Tide's lead had been cut to 49–14. On the ensuing kickoff by Bourgeois, Jameson Williams ran 83 yards to the end zone for his second kickoff return for a touchdown of the game, putting the Tide ahead 56–14. The Tide found paydirt again with 2:49 remaining as Jalen Milroe found Javon Baker for a 24-yard touchdown. The Tide won the game 63–14. Bryce Young was 20 of 22 for 313 yards, 4 touchdowns, and an interception. Roydell Williams was the Tide's first 100-yard rusher of the season with 110 yards and a touchdown. Jahleel Billingsley was Alabama's first 100-yard receiver of the season, accounting for 105 yards and a touchdown. Jameson Williams accounted for 3 touchdowns. The Tide had 606 yards of total offense, including 395 yards through the air and 211 on the ground.

No. 12 Ole Miss

For the first home SEC contest of the season, Ole Miss head coach Lane Kiffin, who was offensive coordinator under Saban's Tide from 2014 to 2016, returned to Bryant-Denny Stadium. The Rebels received the opening kickoff and drove to the Alabama 6. However, a 4th-and-1 rush by Jerrion Ealy came up short of the line-to-gain. The Crimson Tide offense answered by driving 94 yards in 13 plays. Bryce Young completed a 16-yard touchdown pass to John Metchie III to put Alabama ahead 7–0. On the Rebels' second drive, Kiffin elected to attempt another fourth-down conversion. Matt Corral failed to connect with Braylon Sanders, allowing Alabama to take over in Ole Miss territory. At the end of the first quarter Alabama led 7–0. With 12:14 left in the half, Brian Robinson Jr. scored on a 1-yard run to put the Tide ahead 14–0. Ole Miss's next drive stalled and resulted in a Mac Brown punt. Alabama's next drive stalled as well. On their next drive, the Rebels offense attempted their third 4th-down conversion of the first half. On 4th-and-1 from the Rebels' own 31, Jerrion Ealy was stopped by the Tide defense for a 4-yard loss. Alabama's offense reached paydirt 6 plays later, with Bryce Young connecting with Cameron Latu for a 3-yard touchdown; Alabama led 21–0. On the Rebels' next offensive play, Phidarian Mathis sacked Matt Corral and forced the quarterback to fumble. Defensive end Justin Eboigbe recovered the fumble at the Ole Miss 14. 4 plays later, Robinson scored his second touchdown of the game off a 1-yard run. The Tide led 28–0, and it took that lead into the locker room.

To begin the second half, the Tide offense drove 77 yards in 6 plays. Brian Robinson scored another 1-yard touchdown, his third score of the game. The Tide led 35–0. Ole Miss responded with an 11-play, 75-yard drive, culminating with a 10-yard touchdown run by Corral. The Tide lead was now 35–7. On its following series, the Tide offense drove to the Ole Miss 15. However, Ole Miss regained possession after Bryce Young was picked off by Keidron Smith. The Rebels went three-and-out after the interception. At the end of the third quarter, Alabama led 35–7. The Tide then drove 66 yards in 9 plays as Brian Robinson scored his fourth touchdown of the day from 2 yards out. The Tide lead was now 42–7 with 10:47 remaining. The Rebels' offense then drove 85 yards in 7 plays; Snoop Conner scored from 1 yard out. The 'Bama lead was reduced to 42–14. After Brian Robinson failed to convert on a 4th-and-1 from midfield, Ole Miss regained possession with 4:17 to go. The Rebels drove 50 yards in 10 plays as Corral connected with tight end Chase Rogers for a 2-yard touchdown. The Tide lead was now 42–21. The Tide got the ball back and ran out the clock. The final score was 42–21. Matt Corral completed 21 of 29 passes for 213 yards and a touchdown. Bryce Young went 20 of 26 for 241 yards, 2 touchdowns, and an interception. Brian Robinson Jr. ran for 171 yards on 36 carries, earning 4 touchdowns along the way. The Crimson Tide offense compiled 451 total yards, including 210 on the ground.

at Texas A&M

For its third SEC contest of the season, the Tide traveled to Kyle Field to face the Texas A&M Aggies. After receiving the opening kickoff, the Aggies drove to the Alabama 21 but had to settle for a 38-yard field goal by Seth Small, putting A&M ahead 3–0. The Tide offense responded with a 20-yard touchdown from Bryce Young to Roydell Williams, making the score 7-3 Alabama. A&M found the end zone three plays later as Zach Calzada connected with Jalen Wydermyer for a 27-yard touchdown. A&M now lead 10–7. After Brian Robinson Jr. fumbled at the Alabama 45, Calzada found Ainias Smith for a 6-yard touchdown to give the Aggies a 17–7 lead. At the end of the first quarter Texas A&M led 17–7. Early in the second quarter the Tide had a 3rd-and-goal at the A&M 1. However, Young was intercepted by Demani Richardson. Later in the quarter Calzada was picked off by DeMarcco Hellams, leading to a 38-yard field goal by Will Reichard. The Tide now trailed 17–10. Following the field goal, the Aggies drove 75 yards in 7 plays, culminating in a 15-yard touchdown run by Isaiah Spiller. The Aggies would take a 24–10 lead into the locker room.

To open the second half the Tide offense reached the Texas A&M 31, but the drive stalled and ended with a James Burnip punt. However Alabama's special teams came through on the next series when Ja'Corey Brooks blocked Nik Constantinou's punt deep in Aggie territory. Junior linebacker King Mwikuta recovered the ball in the end zone for a touchdown, cutting the deficit to 24–17. The Aggies' special teams had an answer of their own as Devon Achane returned the ensuing kickoff 96 yards for a touchdown, putting the Aggies ahead 31–17. The Tide offense found the end zone six plays later when Young found Jameson Williams for a 29-yard touchdown. The Aggies' lead was now 31–24. After the defense got a stop, the Tide got the ball back at the Alabama 43. The Aggies took a 31–24 lead into the fourth quarter. After failing to convert on a 3rd-and-13 from the A&M 20, the Tide had to settle for a 26-yard Reichard field goal. The Aggies' lead was now 31–27. After earning another defensive stop, the Tide offense once again drove deep into A&M territory. After having a 1st-and-goal from the 3, however, 'Bama had to settle for a 22-yard field goal, cutting the deficit to 31–30. After the Aggies' offense went three-and-out, Young led the Tide offense 82 yards in 9 plays, connecting with Jameson Williams for a 7-yard touchdown. Young connected with Williams again on the ensuing two-point conversion, putting the Tide ahead 38–31, the team's first lead since the first quarter. Six plays later Calzada connected again with Ainias Smith for a 25-yard score, tying the game 38-38. Alabama took possession at its own 25 with 2:54 remaining but punted three plays later. Calzada then led the Aggies 54 yards in 8 plays, leading to a 28-yard Seth Small field goal as time expired. The Aggies won the game 41–38, their first win over the Tide since the 2012 season.

at Mississippi State

Sources:

After falling to Texas A&M in College Station, the Tide went on the road for the second week in a row against the Mississippi State Bulldogs. On the Bulldogs' opening series quarterback Will Rogers was intercepted by Josh Jobe. Six plays later Bryce Young found John Metchie III for a 46-yard touchdown to put the Tide ahead 7–0. The Bulldogs responded with a 44-yard Brandon Ruiz field goal to make the count 7–3. On State's next series Rogers was intercepted again by Jordan Battle, who returned it 40 yards for a Crimson Tide touchdown, putting the Tide ahead 14–3. The Tide led 14–3 at the end of the first quarter. After getting the ball at their own 7 with 10:25 left in the half, Bryce Young led the Tide 93 yards to paydirt after Brian Robinson Jr. scored from 1 yard out. With 3:15 remaining the Tide led 21–3. The Bulldogs responded by driving to the Alabama 10, but they were forced to settle for a 37-yard field goal by Ruiz, cutting the deficit to 21–6. The Tide took a 21–6 lead into the locker room.

On the first offensive play of the second half, Bryce Young connected with Jameson Williams for a 75-yard touchdown. The Tide lead was extended to 28–6. State responded by driving to the Alabama 8. However, after a sack by Will Anderson Jr., the Bulldogs had to settle for another Ruiz field goal. With 10:40 remaining State trailed 28–9. After trading punts, Young led the Tide offense 84 yards in 7 plays, connecting with Robinson for a 51-yard touchdown, putting 'Bama ahead 35–9. Heading into the fourth quarter, the score remained 35–9. On Alabama's next drive, Robinson found the end zone again, this time from 3 yards out. The Tide lead was 42–9 with 12:37 left. On its next series, Young found sophomore wideout Traeshon Holden for a 29-yard touchdown to put 'Bama ahead 49–9. On State's ensuing possession, Jordan Battle obtained his second interception of the day. The Crimson Tide ran out the clock to win 49–9. Bryce Young completed 20 of 28 passes for 348 yard and 4 touchdowns, and the Tide offense outgained the Bulldogs 543–299.

Tennessee

Sources:

After a convincing win in Starkville, the Tide returned to Tuscaloosa to face its longtime rival, the Tennessee Volunteers. Alabama had won the previous fourteen meetings. After a Tennessee three-and-out, the Tide offense drove 85 yards in 12 plays as Brian Robinson Jr. scored from 8 yards out. The Tide led 7–0 with 8:05 to go. Hendon Hooker then took the Vols 75 yards in 8 plays, connecting with Velus Jones Jr. for an 8-yard touchdown. With 6:15 remaining the score was tied 7-7. On its next series Alabama drove to the Tennessee 33, but Will Reichard failed to convert on a 54-yard field goal. Hooker then connected with JaVonta Payton for a 57-yard touchdown, putting the Vols ahead 14–7 with 26 seconds remaining in the quarter. On its ensuing series Alabama quickly drove into Volunteer territory. On 1st-and-10 from the Vols 25, Young hit Jameson Williams at the 9. Cornerback Kamal Hadden then forced Williams to fumble, and Kenneth George Jr. recovered with 14:13 to go. After a punt by Paxton Brooks, the Tide took over at the Tennessee 44. Seven plays later, Bryce Young found the end zone on a 5-yard touchdown run. With 9:27 to go the score was tied 14-14. After a Vols three-and-out, the Tide drove 79 yards in 12 plays as Young found John Metchie III for a 6-yard touchdown. With 2:34 to go, the Tide led 21–14. The Tide took a 21–14 lead into halftime.

Early in the third quarter, the Vols' De'Shawn Rucker blocked a punt by James Burnip, giving Tennessee the ball at the Alabama 16. The Tide defense held the Vols to a 32-yard Chase McGrath field goal. With 9:44 to go the score was 21–17. Alabama drove to the Tennessee 28 on its next possession but had to settle for a 45-yard field goal by Will Reichard. The Tide lead was 24–17 with 6:22 remaining in the quarter. On the Tide's next possession, Young led the offense 80 yards in 11 plays as the quarterback scored his second rushing touchdown of the day. With 14:51 remaining in the game Alabama's lead was 31–17. The Vols responded with a 70-yard touchdown pass from Hooker to Cedric Tillman, cutting the deficit to 31–24. After a 65-yard reception by Jameson Williams, Brian Robinson Jr. scored from 15 yards out. With 12:42 left the Tide led 38–24. On the Vols next offensive series, after driving to the Alabama 43, Hooker was picked off by Jalyn Armour-Davis. Armour-Davis returned the interception 47 yards. From there the Tide extended its lead to 45–24 with a 1-yard touchdown by Robinson. After the Vols failed to convert a 4th-and-6 from their own 29, Young found Metchie for a 19-yard score. With 5:01 remaining the Tide led 52–24, and it would go on to win the game by that score. It was Alabama's 15th consecutive victory over the Volunteers, a series record.

LSU

Sources:

After a bye week, the No. 3-ranked Crimson Tide hosted the LSU Tigers at Bryant-Denny Stadium, facing the Tigers' lame-duck head coach Ed Orgeron. It was a rematch of the Game of the Century between the rivals two years prior. After receiving the opening kickoff, the Tide offense drove to the LSU 32. However, placekicker Will Reichard missed a 49-yard field goal. LSU responded with by driving 68 yards in 8 plays for a touchdown as Max Johnson connected with Brian Thomas Jr. With 8:33 left in the opening quarter, the Tigers led 7–0. After the two teams traded punts, the Tide drove to the LSU 33. However, a delay of game penalty, sack, and illegal formation penalty led to a 4th-and-31 and a James Burnip punt. On its next series, Alabama drove to the LSU 39 but turned the ball over on downs after Bryce Young failed to connect with John Metchie III on 4th-and-2. The Tigers took over with 11:45 remaining in the half but punted six plays later. Young then led the Tide offense 77 yards in 12 plays, capped by a 2-yard touchdown run by Brian Robinson Jr. With 2:52 left in the half the score was tied 7-7. On the Tigers' ensuing series, Max Johnson was picked off by Jalyn Armour-Davis, allowing the Tide to take over at the LSU 39. On 3rd-and-goal at the 8, Young connected with Metchie for an 8-yard touchdown, giving the Tide a 14–7 lead with 48 seconds remaining in the half. After Max Johnson was sacked by Will Anderson Jr., the teams went into halftime with the Tide ahead 14–7.

On LSU's opening possession of the second half, Phidarian Mathis recovered a fumble by running back Tyrion Davis-Price. Alabama took over at its own 42. Two plays later Young found Jameson Williams for a 58-yard touchdown. Reichard's PAT was no good, so with 12:51 remaining in the third the Tide's lead was 20–7. After the two teams traded punts, Johnson took the Tigers offense 89 yards in 14 plays as he connected with tight end Jack Bech for an 8-yard touchdown. With 2:27 remaining in the third, 'Bama's lead was cut to 20–14. The Tide went three-and-out on their next series. After a 37-yard run by Davis-Price, LSU had 1st-and-goal at the Alabama 8. On 4th-and-goal from the 7, the 'Bama defense held as Johnson failed to connect with Trey Palmer. The Tide took over and continued to chew clock. On 3rd-and-5 from the LSU 46, safety Cameron Lewis sacked Bryce Young. Young fumbled the ball, which was recovered by defensive tackle Jaquelin Roy at the Alabama 42. With 2:36 remaining, the Tigers had a 4th-and-9 from the 41. The Tide defense held its own again as Johnson could not connect with Bech. Even after LSU used its final timeout, the Tide could not run out the game clock. After a 31-yard punt by Burnip, the Tigers took over at their own 38. On 4th-and-9, Johnson connected with Thomas for a first down at the Alabama 45. Johnson then found Jaray Jenkins at the 30. Jenkins went out of bounds with 5 seconds remaining. On the final play of the game, Max Johnson's pass to the end zone fell incomplete. The Tide held on to win 20–14.

New Mexico State

Sources:

No. 21 Arkansas

at Auburn

vs. No. 1 Georgia

Postseason

vs. No. 4 Cincinnati 

Sources:

vs. No. 3 Georgia 

Sources:

Rankings

Statistics

Scoring

Scores by quarter (non-conference opponents)

Scores by quarter (SEC opponents)

Scores by quarter (All opponents)

Team statistics

Offense

Defense
 

Key: POS: Position, SOLO: Solo Tackles, AST: Assisted Tackles, TOT: Total Tackles, TFL: Tackles-for-loss, SACK: Quarterback Sacks, INT: Interceptions, BU: Passes Broken Up, PD: Passes Defended, QBH: Quarterback Hits, FR: Fumbles Recovered, FF: Forced Fumbles, BLK: Kicks or Punts Blocked, SAF: Safeties, TD : Touchdown

Special teams

After the season

Awards and SEC honors

All-Americans

All Star games

NFL draft

The NFL Draft was held in Las Vegas, Nevada on April 28–30, 2022.

Crimson Tide who were picked in the 2022 NFL Draft:

Media affiliates

Radio
 WTID (FM) (Tide 102.9) – Nationwide (Dish Network, Sirius XM, TuneIn radio and iHeartRadio)

TV
CBS Family – CBS 42 (CBS), CBS Sports Network 
ESPN/ABC Family – ABC 33/40 (ABC), ABC, ESPN, ESPN2, ESPNU, ESPN+, SEC Network)
FOX Family – WBRC (FOX), FOX/FS1, FSN
NBC – WVTM-TV, NBC Sports, NBCSN

References

Alabama
Alabama Crimson Tide football seasons
Southeastern Conference football champion seasons
Alabama Crimson Tide football
Cotton Bowl Classic champion seasons